A drumometer is an electronic device invented by Boo McAfee and Craig A. Kestner (aka Craig Alan) that is used to count drum strokes.

Drumometer is patented technology protected by US Patent #6,545,207.

Official status
The Drumometer is accepted by Guinness World Records and the WFD World's Fastest Drummer Extreme Sport Drumming organization as the official device used to determine the World's Fastest Drummer. WFD World's Fastest Drummer Extreme Sport Drumming describes the sporting event that utilizes the Drumometer.

2015 Legal Filings-Defending the Drumometer Patent US #6,545,207
McAfee has filed patent infringement lawsuits in Chicago against Guitar Center, Ahead Products, Inc. and Cherub Technology Inc., who sell a similar drum stroke counting device, and Yamaha Corporation of America, who has incorporated a drum stroke counting feature in its popular line of DTX electronic drum kits.

In response to an ongoing controversy in the music world over who was, in fact, the world’s fastest drummer, Boo McAfee teamed up with electrical engineer and drummer, Craig Alan Kestner, and developed the DrumometerTM to accurately count drum strokes on a drum pad. McAfee and Kestner were awarded U.S. Patent No. 6,545,207 on their invention, and began promoting “World’s Fastest Drummer®” (“WFD”) competitions with the DrumometerTM.  Craig left Drumometer in 2007 to continue a career in engineering but still owns the first Drumometer prototype affectionately known as Frankenstein.

“Extreme Sport Drumming” competitions are now regularly held worldwide, and have been featured on CNN, MTV, VH1, PBS, FOX and ESPN. Boo McAfee and Extreme Sport Drumming were recently the subject of the film Fast Company, which opened to rave reviews at the Milwaukee Film Festival on September 27, 2015.

The popularity of Extreme Sport Drumming, however, has led to many imitators of the patented DrumometerTM. After trying for years to license, or stop. the sales of copycat drum stroke counting devices, McAfee has now begun filing patent infringement lawsuits with the help of patent attorney Anthony Dowell of Chicago.

“I contacted all of the companies selling imitation drum stroke counting pads,” McAfee said. “Unfortunately, none of them would respect my patent rights and pay a reasonable license fee. Guitar Center told me they wouldn’t even talk to me unless I filed ‘formal proceedings.’ So that’s what we did.”

“Boo’s experience is common these days,” patent attorney Anthony Dowell explained. “In today’s patent climate, companies have no respect for inventors or patent rights. Most will ignore an inventor until a patent infringement lawsuit is filed. That usually gets their attention.”   Dowell has filed three patent infringement lawsuits for McAfee in the United States District Court for the Northern District of Illinois, the first against Guitar Center and Yamaha on October 27, 2015 (15-cv-9555) and two more against Ahead Products, Inc. (15-cv-10395) and Cherub Technology Inc. (15-cv-10403) on November 18, 2015.

WFD competitions
The primary goal of most WFD competitions is to determine who can play the most single strokes in sixty seconds. According to author Josh Davis, "the Drumometer uncovered a deep well of competitiveness." After experimenting with various WFD competition formats in the southern United States, the event achieved international prominence when respected studio and clinic drummer Johnny Rabb became the first person to break 1,000 single strokes in 60 seconds, claiming the title World's Fastest Hands and recognition from the record keepers at Guinness. McAfee and Kestner then officially sanctioned their events and copyrighted the phrase World's Fastest Drummer. This was followed by ads in Drum! and Modern Drummer magazines touting Rabb's accomplishment and their Drumometer device. Subsequently they created new classes of speed drumming: fastest feet (for two-footed bass drumming), bare hands, and tag team, among others. Drumometer orders then followed, and the race to best Rabb's feats began. Musical genres - death metal, country, jazz, screamo - have since battled for dominance in the various categories.

References

 By George Broyer "The Rise of Speed Drumming", The Drumometer - Retrieved in 2005.
 By Blabbermouth.net "International Speed Competition", NAMM 2006 - Retrieved in 2006.
 US Patent Office Patent #6,545,207 
 Musicians Friend 
 MOST DRUMBEATS IN A MINUTE USING DRUMSTICKS Performed by Indian Youngest Drummer Karman Soni - World Records India 

Drum machines